Ruino is a comune (municipality) in the Province of Pavia in the Italian region Lombardy, located about 60 km south of Milan and about 30 km southeast of Pavia.

The center of the municipality is the village of Pometo. Pometo, whose population numbers  200, is known for bread production.

Ruino borders the following municipalities: Alta Val Tidone, Borgoratto Mormorolo, Canevino, Fortunago, Montalto Pavese, Rocca de' Giorgi, Val di Nizza, Valverde, Zavattarello.

References

Cities and towns in Lombardy